General Baptists are Baptists who hold the general or unlimited atonement view, the belief that Jesus Christ died for the entire world and not just for the chosen elect. General Baptists are theologically Arminian, which distinguishes them from Reformed Baptists (also known as "Particular Baptists" for their belief in particular redemption).

Free Will Baptists are General Baptists; opponents of the English General Baptists in North Carolina dubbed them "Freewillers" and they later assumed the name.

General Baptist denominations have explicated their faith in two major confessions of faith, "The Standard Confession" (1660), and "The Orthodox Creed" (1678).

History 
The first Baptists, led by John Smyth and Thomas Helwys in the late 16th and early 17th century, were General Baptists. Under Helwys' leadership, this group established the first Baptist church in England at Spitalfields outside London. Helwys is credited with the formation of a general Baptist congregation in Coventry in 1614 or earlier when he gathered with Smyth and leading Coventry Puritans at the residence of Sir William Bowes and his wife, Isobel, in 1606. Thomas Grantham, along with others, presented a confession of beliefs to King Charles II in 1660. A respected Biblical scholar, Dr. Charles Marie Du Veil, was baptized into the St. Paul's Alley congregation, published his new views, and helped the General Baptist influence after 1685. In 1733 a case against several Northamptonshire congregations was presented to the General Assembly of General Baptists for "singing the psalms of David or other men's composures" which determined no fixed rule on congregational singing, but deferred to the local church to set forth their own reasons as the general assembly had in 1689.

The term is also used as a designation for specific groups of Baptists.

In 1825, opponents of General Baptists in North Carolina dubbed them "Freewillers" and they later assumed the name Free Will Baptists.

General Baptists who accepted the existence of a second work of grace during the Holiness Movement established denominations such as the Ohio Valley Association of the Christian Baptist Churches of God and Holiness Baptist Association.

General Baptist denominations 
 Evangelical Free Baptist Church
 General Association of General Baptists
 General Six-Principle Baptists
 Holiness Baptist Association
 Some Independent Baptist churches
 Marianas Association of General Baptists
 National Association of Free Will Baptists
 New Connexion of General Baptists
 Ohio Valley Association of the Christian Baptist Churches of God 
 Old Baptist Union
 Original Free Will Baptist Convention 
 United American Free Will Baptist Church
 United American Free Will Baptist Conference

References

External links
The Standard Confession - confession of faith upheld by General Baptists
The Orthodox Creed - confession of faith upheld by General Baptists

Protestant theology
English Reformation
Baptist movements
Arminian denominations
Christian terminology